Popolutovo is a rural locality (a village) in Kovarditskoye Rural Settlement, Muromsky District, Vladimir Oblast, Russia. The population was 7 as of 2010. There are 3 streets.

Geography 
Popolutovo is located 21 km northwest of Murom (the district's administrative centre) by road. Savkovo is the nearest rural locality.

References 

Rural localities in Muromsky District